The Victory Program was a military plan for the United States involvement in World War II submitted prior to the country's official entry into the war following the Japanese attack on Pearl Harbor.  The plan was initially secret, but was famously exposed by the Chicago Tribune on December 4, 1941, 3 days before Pearl Harbor.

History
On July 9, 1941, President Franklin D. Roosevelt ordered his secretary of war, Henry Stimson, and his secretary of the Navy, Frank Knox, to prepare a plan for the “overall production requirements required to defeat our potential enemies.”  This plan was leaked to U.S. Senator and prominent isolationist Burton Wheeler of Montana who in turn gave it to the equally isolationist editor of the Chicago Tribune, Robert R. McCormick.

In 1941, a team of officers led by General Albert Wedemeyer on behalf of General George C. Marshall drew up the Victory Program, whose premise was that the Soviet Union would be defeated that year, and that to defeat Nazi Germany would require the United States to raise by the summer of 1943 a force of 215 divisions comprising 8.7 million men.

The release of the plan caused an uproar among the isolationist bloc in the United States, but the controversy died off quickly only three days later, after news of the attack on Pearl Harbor was received and a formal declaration of war was made.

References

 

Military history of the United States during World War II
December 1941 events
1941 documents